Modular Man is a fictional Marvel Comics supervillain.

Modular Man can also refer to:

Modular Man (America's Best Comics), a fictional supervillain, nemesis of Tom Strong, from the pages of America's Best Comics
Modular Man (Wild Cards), a character in the Wild Cards book series
The Modular Man, a 1992 novel by Roger Macbride Allen
Modular man, also referred to as Le Modulor, an anthropometric scale of proportions devised by the Swiss-born French architect Le Corbusier
Modular Man, a concept used by social anthropologist Ernest Gellner in his Conditions of Liberty (1994)